Mariri (Mairiri) is an Austronesian language spoken on the Aru Islands of eastern Indonesia. It is close to Batuley.

References

Aru languages
Languages of Indonesia